is a Japanese rugby sevens player. She competed at the 2016 Summer Olympics for the Japanese women's sevens team.

Suzuki was part of the Japanese squad that played at the 2012 USA Sevens. She also played at the 2013 USA Women's Sevens. She was named in the squad to the 2017 Women's Rugby World Cup. Since November 2020, she plays for Wasps Women based in West London.

Suzuki was selected in Japan's squad for the 2021 Rugby World Cup in New Zealand.

References

External links 
 
 Japan Player Profile

1989 births
Living people
Olympic rugby sevens players of Japan
Japanese rugby sevens players
Japan international women's rugby sevens players
Rugby sevens players at the 2016 Summer Olympics
Sportspeople from Yokohama
Rugby union players at the 2010 Asian Games
Asian Games competitors for Japan
Japanese female international rugby union players